The GE U33B was a diesel-electric locomotive that was offered by GE in 1966, featuring a 16-cylinder motor.

Original owners

External links
 Sarberenyi, Robert. GE U33B Original Owners.

U33B
B-B locomotives
Diesel-electric locomotives of the United States
Railway locomotives introduced in 1966
Freight locomotives
Standard gauge locomotives of the United States